Chahestan (also Romanized as Chāhestān and Chāhistān; also known as Shāhestān) is a village in Takht Rural District, Takht District, Bandar Abbas County, Hormozgan Province, Iran. At the 2006 census, its population was 1,191, in 293 families.

References 

Populated places in Bandar Abbas County